The Chinese Ghostbuster is a 1994 Hong Kong ghost film directed by Wu Ma and produced by Leung Tung-leung. The film stars Wu Ma himself as well as Lam Ching-ying.

Plot

In the spirit plain the ghosts of a man (Wu Ma) and his daughter (Mondi Yau Yuet Ching) transcend to the human world as he seeks a worthy husband for her. This comes in the form of a street hustler (Mark Cheng) who  is chased by the ghosts until he seeks help from a Taoist priest (Lam Ching-ying)to vanquish them.

Cast
Wu Ma as a ghostly man searching for a husband for his daughter (portraited of Zhong Kui.)
Mondi Yau Yuet Ching as his daughter
Mark Cheng as a street hustler that is haunted by the ghosts
Lam Ching-ying as a Taoist priest

References

External links
 
 

Hong Kong ghost films
Hong Kong fantasy films
1990s supernatural films
1990s Hong Kong films